There are at least 39 named lakes and reservoirs in Independence County, Arkansas.

Lakes
	Brown Lake, el.  
	Brushy Lake, el.  
	Cow Pond, el.  
	Cow Pond, el.  
	Curia Lake, el.  
	Dota Old River, el.  
	Eagle Lake, el.  
	Fish Lake, el.  
	Goose Lake, el.  
	Grassy Lake, el.  
	Grunnel Slough, el.  
	Hog Pond, el.  
	Horseshoe Lake, el.  
	Horseshoe Lake, el.  
	Lake Whitstine, el.  
	Little Cow Pond, el.  
	Long Lake, el.  
	Lower Curia Lake, el.  
	Meadow Lake, el.  
	Otter Lake, el.  
	Racetrack Lake, el.  
	Ramsey Slough, el.  
	Round Lake, el.  
	Round Lake, el.  
	Ruddell Lake, el.  
	Wall Lake, el.  
	Waugh Pond, el.  
	Yoncopin Lake, el.

Reservoirs
	Beatty Pond, el.  
	Goforth Reservoir, el.  
	Lake Kimberly, el.  
	Lake Unico, el.  
	Lee Britten Lake, el.  
	Morris Stuart Lake, el.  
	Mud Creek Site One Reservoir, el.  
	Pascoe J Stafford Lake, el.  
	R L Knies Lake, el.  
	United States Mag Corp Lake, el.  
	Vaughn Wilson Lake, el.

See also

 List of lakes in Arkansas

Notes

Bodies of water of Independence County, Arkansas
Independence